The Rider is a 2017 American contemporary western film written, produced and directed by Chloé Zhao. The film stars Brady Jandreau, Lilly Jandreau, Tim Jandreau, Lane Scott, and Cat Clifford and was shot in the Badlands of South Dakota. It premiered in the Directors' Fortnight section at the Cannes Film Festival on May 20, 2017, where it won the Art Cinema Award. It was released in theaters in the United States on April 13, 2018. It grossed $4 million and was critically praised for its story, performances, and the depiction of the people and events that influenced the film.

Plot
All of the characters are Lakota Sioux of the Pine Ridge Reservation in South Dakota. Brady lives in poverty with his father Wayne and his autistic teenaged sister, Lilly. Once a rising rodeo star, Brady suffered brain damage from a rodeo accident, weakening his right hand and leaving him prone to seizures. Doctors have told him that riding will make them worse. 
 
Brady regularly visits his friend, Lane, who lives in a care facility after suffering brain damage from a similar accident. Brady's father does little for the family, spending their income on drinking and gambling. Once, to fund their trailer, he sells their horse, Gus, infuriating Brady.

Brady takes a job in a local convenience store to raise money for the family. He also makes some money breaking in horses. With his savings, he intends to buy another horse, specifically a temperamental horse named Apollo, but his father actually buys it for him and Brady bonds with it, as he had with Gus. However, his riding and refusal to rest cause him to have a near-fatal seizure. Doctors warn him that more riding could be fatal. Upon returning home, Brady finds that his horse has had an accident, permanently injuring a leg. Knowing that the horse will never be able to be ridden ever again, and not being able to bring himself to put his own horse down, he must have his father to do it for him. 
 
After an argument with his father, Brady decides to take part in a rodeo competition, despite the doctors' warnings. At the competition, just before he competes, he sees his family watching him. He finally decides to walk away from the competition and life as a rodeo rider.

Cast
The cast of the movie consists entirely of non-professional Lakota actors from the Pine Ridge Reservation playing fictionalized versions of themselves, including Jandreau's father, sister, wife, and several of his friends.

Production 
Zhao first met horse trainer Brady Jandreau in July 2014 during a return visit to the Pine Ridge Reservation where Zhao had shot her first film, Songs My Brother Taught Me. Zhao was immediately drawn to Jandreau as an actor and decided to write a script for him: "I felt like he could be a movie star, like I had discovered a young Heath Ledger or something." Seeing him train a horse she thought, “If he can manipulate the emotions of a horse, maybe he can manipulate an audience. Maybe he can act.” Zhao said, “Right away, I called [Richards] and said, 'I think I met someone who can carry a movie.' The way he trains horses was what convinced me the most. To see him act like a father, like a mother, like a friend, like a dance partner to a wild animal and get that animal to trust him — I figured maybe he could do that for the camera as well.” One scene in the film documents Jandreau taming a horse in real-time.

Zhao wrote a few stories for Jandreau after meeting him in 2014, but felt none of them worked. The film is loosely based on Jandreau's real-life injury on April 1, 2016 when a bucking horse stepped on his head, cutting a three-inch, knuckle-deep gash in Jandreau's skull, grinding manure and sand into his brain and causing Jandreau to go into a seizure. Jandreau was put into an induced coma for three days and underwent surgery at the hospital; the beginning of the movie is influenced by Jandreau's "crazy-ass dreams" of a horse cloaked in shadow during this time. The film contains footage of Jandreau's accident, and shows the scar in his head in multiple scenes. Jandreau's injury and recovery affected the message Zhao wanted the film to convey: "I wished that Brady would see hope in his life after the rodeo, which inspired me to take his character in that direction." Zhao began by writing a treatment, incorporating lines said to her by Jandreau and others in their time together, including the line that made her decide to make the film: "If any animals around here got hurt like I did, they would get put down."

After the struggles she had developing and financing her first film, Zhao decided to "start with nothing and then just do something real cheap. And do it right away because I can't do the development thing anymore." Zhao decided to make the film in August 2016 and started shooting in September. Zhao covered the film's production costs herself, using her and her boyfriend's (cinematographer Joshua James Richards) credit cards. There were only six crew members, including Zhao, and they relied on natural light and Walmart LED strips for lighting (Zhao says she will "shoot every magic hour if I am alive"). Filming took place at local horse sales, rodeos, and auctions for free, incorporating "all these extras, who are perfectly costumed, all these old cowboys – you couldn't have cast and staged this." The cast consists entirely of non-professional Lakota actors from the Pine Ridge Reservation playing fictionalized versions of themselves, including Jandreau, who grew up riding and training horses, as well as his father, sister, wife, and several of his friends.

Jandreau's childhood best friend, Lane Scott, also features in the movie. Scott became disabled in a car accident four years before filming, and had messaged Zhao about the film on Facebook. Zhao had not met Scott until the night of filming, and was unsure of how far she could push him. Jandreau assured Zhao that Scott would want to do it, so they drove eight hours to the rehabilitation center Scott had been moved to in Omaha. It was Jandreau's first time seeing Scott at the rehabilitation center and the first time Scott had seen Jandreau since Jandreau's injury. They filmed for four hours at the rehabilitation center, and Scott "loved that because he was being treated like he was doing a job, not as someone who’s disabled." A documentary crew had been preparing to make a feature documentary about Scott before his accident, but pulled out after he was injured. Zhao said this was "so silly, because that's where the story starts".

Zhao spent the first few months after filming wrapped editing the 50 hours of footage captured, finishing the first cut of the film herself.

Release
Sony Pictures Classics acquired the distribution rights in the U.S. and other territories two days following its premiere at the 2017 Cannes Film Festival.

Reception

Box office
The Rider grossed $2.4 million in the United States and Canada, and $1.7 million in other territories, for a worldwide total of $4.2 million.

Critical response
On review aggregator Rotten Tomatoes, the film holds an approval rating of 97% based on 191 reviews, and an average rating of 8.50/10. The website's critical consensus reads, "The Riders hard-hitting drama is only made more effective through writer-director Chloé Zhao's use of untrained actors to tell the movie's fact-based tale." On Metacritic, the film has a weighted average score of 91 out of 100, based on 42 critics, indicating "universal acclaim".

Godfrey Cheshire of RogerEbert.com gave the film 4 out of 4 stars, writing that its "style, its sense of light and landscape and mood, simultaneously give it the mesmerizing force of the most confident cinematic poetry."

Former United States President Barack Obama listed The Rider among his favorite films of 2018, in his annual list of favorite films.

Top ten lists
The Rider was listed on numerous critics' top ten lists for 2018.

 1st – Michael Phillips, Chicago Tribune
 1st – Alison Willmore, BuzzFeed
 1st – Randy Myers, San Jose Mercury News
 1st – Peter Debruge, Variety
 2nd – Godfrey Cheshire, RogerEbert.com
 3rd – Stephen Farber, The Hollywood Reporter
 3rd – Owen Gleiberman, Variety
 3rd – Ann Hornaday, The Washington Post
 4th – David Edelstein, New York Magazine
 4th – Nick Schager, Esquire
 5th – Matt Singer, ScreenCrush
 6th – Seongyong Cho & Sheila O'Malley, RogerEbert.com
 6th – Emily Yoshida, New York Magazine
 6th – Marlow Stern, The Daily Beast
 7th – Jake Coyle, Associated Press
 7th – David Fear, Rolling Stone
 7th – Todd McCarthy, The Hollywood Reporter
 7th – Justin Chang, Los Angeles Times
 7th – Nicholas Barber, BBC
 8th – Donald Clarke & Tara Brady, The Irish Times
 8th – Scott Tobias, Filmspotting
 9th – Christopher Orr, The Atlantic
 10th – Philip Martin, Arkansas Democrat-Gazette
 10th – Sara Stewart, New York Post
 Top 10 (listed alphabetically) – Gary Thompson, Philadelphia Daily News
 Top 10 (listed alphabetically) – Moira Macdonald, Seattle Times
 Top 10 (listed alphabetically) – James Verniere, Boston Herald
Best of 2018 (listed alphabetically, not ranked) – Gary M. Kramer, Salon.com
Best of 2018 (listed alphabetically, not ranked), NPR
Best of 2018 (listed alphabetically, not ranked) – Ty Burr, The Boston Globe

Accolades

References

External links
 
 
 
 

2017 films
2017 independent films
2017 Western (genre) films
American independent films
American Western (genre) films
American films based on actual events
Films about autism
Films about horses
Films directed by Chloé Zhao
Films set in South Dakota
Films shot in South Dakota
Films about Native Americans
National Society of Film Critics Award for Best Film winners
Neo-Western films
Sony Pictures Classics films
2010s English-language films
2010s American films